The Bosansko Grahovo massacre was a massacre of Croat civilians was committed by local Serb rebels on 27 July 1941 in the village of Bosansko Grahovo.

Background
On 27 July 1941, a Yugoslav Partisan-led uprising began in the area of Dvar and Bosansko Grahovo (Drvar uprising). It was a coordinated effort from both sides of the Una River in the territory of southeastern Lika and southwestern Bosanska. It succeeded in transferring key NDH territory under rebel control.

Incident
On the same day the Trubar massacre occurred, Chetniks and other affiliated Serb rebels, commanded by Branko Bogunović, attacked Croat civilians in Bosansko Grahovo and surrounding villages, killing about 100, of whom 62 were identified. Among those killed were at least 5 women and 9 children. Numerous homes were burned, along with the Catholic church and rectory in Grahovo. A parish priest, Juraj Gospodnetić, was tortured and killed. According to Croatian scholar Blanka Matkovich, the Partisans were responsible for the atrocities against Croatians in Bosansko Grahovo, as well as the Trubar massacre.

See also
 Pogrom in Krnjeuša
 Srb uprising
 Trubar massacre

References

Sources
 

1941 in Bosnia and Herzegovina
July 1941 events
Massacres in 1941
Bosansko Grahovo
Mass murder in 1941
Yugoslav Partisan war crimes in World War II